Foreign relations exist between Austria and Serbia and their predecessor states.  Austria has an embassy in Belgrade. Serbia has an embassy in Vienna and a general consulate in Salzburg. Austria is a European Union member and Serbia is a European Union candidate.

History 

The history of relations between the two countries goes back to the Great Turkish War, Habsburg-occupied Serbia (1686–91) and Great Serb Migrations (formation of Military Frontier and building of Petrovaradin Fortress), to the era when the Kingdom of Serbia (1718–1739) had been a province of the Habsburg monarchy, and the last Austro-Turkish War (1787–91) at the time of Habsburg-occupied Serbia (1788–92).

Foreign relations, as such, date from the proclamation of the Austrian Empire in 1804 and the formation in 1817 of the Principality of Serbia, an autonomous state within the Ottoman Empire.  The Habsburg recognized the independence of Serbia and established diplomatic relations in  1874, supported by the Treaty of Berlin (1878).

Hungarian suppression of Serbian revolts during the 1848 Revolutions were not opposed by the Habsburg rulers.  Serbian claims were not recognized by Hungary was eventually placated with the Austro-Hungarian Compromise of 1867, further angering Serbian nationalists.  One notable flare-up between the two countries was the 1906-1909 economic conflict known as the Pig War followed with the diplomatic and military crisis over the Austrian annexation of Bosnia which contributed to enflame pan-Serb sentiment and helped lay the grounds for World War I. Ultimately, the tensions between the two countries could not withstand the strain of the Assassination of the Austrian Archduke, by a young Bosnian Serb, an opportunity for the Austro-Hungarian government to solve Slav nationalism.

Following the July Crisis, Austro-Hungary launched three unsuccessful offensives to punish Serbia for allegedly supporting the assassins. In October 1915 with the help of German and Bulgarian forces, Serbia was finally conquered and divided into separate occupation zones. The northern three-quarters of Serbia was placed under a harsh Austro-Hungarian occupational regime until its liberation by allied forces in 1918.

The First World War eventually destroyed the Austro-Hungarian Empire, leaving a shrunken First Austrian Republic as a rump state. Serbia annexed much of the former Austrian holdings in the Balkans to become the Kingdom of Serbs, Croats and Slovenes, later the Kingdom of Yugoslavia.  Austria was eventually annexed by Germany, ending its separate foreign relations.

A number of Serb medical doctors and veterinarians got educated in Austria during the interwar period and earlier as well.

Population 
There are between 200,000 and 300,000 people of Serbian descent living in Austria.

Diplomacy
 Serbia has an embassy in Vienna and a consulate-general in Salzburg
 Austria has an embassy in Belgrade and a consulate-general in Niš

See also 
 Foreign relations of Austria
 Foreign relations of Serbia 
 Accession of Serbia to the European Union
 Serbs in Austria
 Austria–Yugoslavia relations

References

Further reading
 Trivanovitch, Vaso. "Serbia, Russia, and Austria during the Rule of Milan Obrenovich, 1868-78" Journal of Modern History (1931) 3#3 pp. 414-440 online

External links
   Austrian Foreign Ministry: list of bilateral treaties with Serbia (in German only)
  Austrian embassy in Belgrade (in German and Serbian only)
  Serbian Ministry of Foreign Affairs about relations with Austria
  Serbian embassy in Vienna (in German and Serbian only)
  Serbian general consulate in Salzburg (in German and Serbian only)

 
Serbia
Bilateral relations of Serbia